Nicolas Kehrli (born 17 January 1983) is a retired Swiss association footballer.

He also played for BSC Young Boys at Swiss Super League.

References

External links
football.ch profile 

Swiss men's footballers
BSC Young Boys players
FC Lausanne-Sport players
SC Kriens players
FC Biel-Bienne players
Swiss Super League players
Association football defenders
1983 births
Living people
Place of birth missing (living people)